Qaemiyeh is a city in Fars Province, Iran.

Qaemiyeh may refer to:
 Qaemiyeh, Anbarabad, Kerman Province
 Qaemiyeh, Rafsanjan, Kerman Province
 Qaemiyeh-ye Do, Rafsanjan County, Kerman Province
 Qaemiyeh, Mazandaran
 Qaemiyeh-ye Olya, Mazandaran Province
 Qaemiyeh-ye Sofla, Mazandaran Province
 Qaemiyeh, Yazd